The tiny pipistrelle (Pipistrellus nanulus) is a species of vesper bat. It can be found in Benin, Burkina Faso, Cameroon, Central African Republic, Democratic Republic of the Congo, Ivory Coast, Equatorial Guinea, Gabon, Ghana, Guinea, Kenya, Liberia, Nigeria, Senegal, Sierra Leone, and Uganda. It is found in subtropical or tropical dry forest, subtropical or tropical moist lowland forest, and moist savanna.

References

Taxa named by Oldfield Thomas
Mammals described in 1904
Pipistrellus
Bats of Africa
Taxonomy articles created by Polbot